Caspar Wistar Hodge Jr. (September 22, 1870 – February 26, 1937) was an American theologian. He was the son of Caspar Wistar Hodge Sr., and grandson of Charles Hodge, and like both of them, he taught at Princeton Theological Seminary, serving as Professor of Systematic Theology from 1915 to 1937.

Hodge studied at Princeton University, Heidelberg University, the University of Berlin, and Princeton Theological Seminary. He taught at Princeton University and Lafayette College before coming to the Seminary. He was ordained as a minister by the Presbytery of New Brunswick in 1902.

Caspar Jr. was the last member of the Hodge family to sit on the faculty of Princeton Seminary. John Murray said of him,
He had brought to bear upon his exposition and defense of this, the Reformed Faith in its integrity, remarkable carefulness of thought, accuracy of knowledge and breadth of scholarship. It was just such qualities that made him admirably worthy of the great Princeton tradition and placed him in the front rank of the Reformed theologians of this generation.

References

1870 births
1937 deaths
Princeton University alumni
Princeton Theological Seminary alumni
Princeton Theological Seminary faculty
Heidelberg University alumni
Humboldt University of Berlin alumni
American Calvinist and Reformed theologians
American Presbyterian ministers
Systematic theologians
Lafayette College faculty